Chiriquí is a province of Panama located on the western coast; it is the second most developed province in the country, after the Panamá Province. Its capital is the city of David. It has a total area of 6,490.9 km², with a population of 462,056 as of the year 2019. 
The province of Chiriquí is bordered to the north by the province of Bocas del Toro, to the west by Costa Rica, to the east by the province of Veraguas, and to the south by the Pacific Ocean, specifically the Gulf of Chiriquí.

History

Until the arrival of the Spanish conquistadores, Chiriquí was populated by a number of indigenous tribes, known collectively as the Guaymí people.

The first European to visit and describe Chiriquí was Gaspar de Espinosa, in 1519. The province was officially established on May 26, 1849, when Panama was still part of Colombia. Several years later, President Abraham Lincoln of the United States proposed Chiriquí as a favored location for Linconia, a colony for free blacks from the United States; some 349 traveled here but most blacks were not interested in colonization elsewhere.

Chiriquí was the province in which Manuel Noriega rose in the military ranks in the late 20th century; he helped bring Omar Torrijos back into the country after a coup d'état. Noriega had jeeps lined up with their lights on the runway in David to allow Torrijos's aircraft to land. Chiriqui was at the heart of a short-lived pro-democracy guerrilla movement in the late 1960s and early 1970s. After the dictatorship by Manuel Noriega from 1983 to 1989, Guillermo Endara became president of Panama; he appointed Edgar De Puy as governor of Chiriquí.

Administrative divisions
Chiriquí Province is divided into 13 distritos (districts) and sub-divided into 100 corregimientos, although a 14th district and an additional corregimiento will take effect from May 2019.

Note: Through Law 55 of 13 September 2013, the creation of Tierras Altas District had been approved, consisting of the corregimientos of Cerro Punta, Cuesta de Piedra, Nueva California, Paso Ancho and Volcán, which were split off from Bugaba District. The new district was to have Volcán as its main centre. Also through that same law, the corregimiento of Solano was created, after splitting off from the corregimiento of La Concepción, Bugaba. That new administrative division within Chiriquí Province was to come into effect by 2 May 2019.

Climate
The province features a variety of climates, from hot and humid lowlands to the cool and moist highlands. The district is home to Fortuna Forest Reserve.

References

External links
 Knowing more about Chiriqui in My Panama Live
K. Holmberg 2010 'Placing Immateriality: Situating the Material of Highland Chiriquí', Internet Archaeology 28.
The Art of Precolumbian Gold: The Jan Mitchell Collection, an exhibition catalog from The Metropolitan Museum of Art (fully available online as PDF), which contains material on Chiriqui

 
Provinces of Panama
States and territories established in 1849
1849 establishments in the Republic of New Granada